Frank Stephen Biscan (March 13, 1920 – May 22, 1959) was an American professional baseball player, a left-handed pitcher who appeared in Major League Baseball for the St. Louis Browns in parts of three seasons (1942; 1946; 1948).

In 74 MLB games (all but four as a relief pitcher) and 148 innings pitched, Biscan allowed 170 hits and 104 bases on balls, with 64 strikeouts.  He recorded one complete game and four saves. In the minor leagues, Biscan won 26 of 30 decisions for the 1940 Lima Pandas of the Class D Ohio State League, and won 17 games for three consecutive seasons (1950–52).

From 1942 to 1945 Biscan served in the United States Navy during World War II. He died from heart disease at the age of 39 in St. Louis, Missouri.

References

External links
Baseball Reference
Retrosheet
Venezuelan Professional Baseball League

1920 births
1959 deaths
United States Navy personnel of World War II
Baseball players from Illinois
Charleston Senators players
Lima Pandas players
Major League Baseball pitchers
Mayfield Browns players
Mayfield Clothiers players
Memphis Chickasaws players
Nashville Vols players
Sabios de Vargas players
St. Louis Browns players
San Antonio Missions players
San Francisco Seals (baseball) players
Toledo Mud Hens players
People from Mount Olive, Illinois
Military personnel from Illinois
Findlay Browns players